Brown Bird was an American folk music group, originally formed in 2003 in Seattle, Washington as a solo project by David Lamb. Adding and changing its membership over time, the band's final incarnation was the duo of Lamb and his wife MorganEve Swain. The band ceased in 2014 following Lamb's death from leukemia.

History
Lamb formed Brown Bird in 2003 in Seattle, Washington but moved soon thereafter to Portland, Maine. The line-up soon included Jerusha Robinson on cello and her husband Jeremy Robinson on multiple instruments.  The Robinsons left the group in 2009, leaving Lamb, MorganEve Swain on fiddle, and Mike Samos on lap steel guitar and dobro in the line-up. 

In 2010, with the departure of Samos, the band had become a duo.

Brown Bird played the Newport Folk Festival for the first time in 2011 and were based in Providence, Rhode Island at the time.  They have toured with The Devil Makes Three.

Brown Bird went on hiatus in early 2013 after David Lamb was diagnosed with leukemia. Lamb died from the disease on April 5, 2014.

In April 2015 Brown Bird's final album, Axis Mundi, was released produced by MorganEve Swain.  Most of Axis Mundi was written and recorded while David was recuperating at home from his bone marrow transplant. It peaked at  #12 on the Billboard Heatseeker Chart.

In 2021, Brown Bird's "Bilgewater" was featured as the theme song of the Syfy television series Resident Alien.

Musical style
Brown Bird is influenced by American folk music, Gypsy music, and bluegrass.  According to Aimsel Ponti of the Portland Press Herald "[t]heir sound is one that lives on the darker side of American folk, ensconced in Eastern European roots music."

Works
Tautology (2007)
Such Unrest (Spring 2007)
 Bottom of the Sea (2008)
 The Devil Dancing (2009)
 The Sound of Ghosts (EP, March 2011) 
 Salt for Salt (October 2011)
 Fits of Reason (April 2013)
 The Teeth of Sea and Beasts - The Poetry of Brown Bird (Book, April 2014)
 The Brown Bird Christmas Album (November 2014)
 Axis Mundi (April 2015)

References

Further reading

External links
 
 
 

American folk musical groups
Musical groups established in 2003
Musical groups from Portland, Maine
Musical groups from Providence, Rhode Island
Musical groups from Seattle
Musical groups disestablished in 2014